The Road to Where (Hebrew: הדרך לאן, tr. Hadereh Lean) is a 96-minute 2016 Israeli Arabic- and Hebrew-language independent underground dramatic historical art film directed by Michal Bat-Adam.

Synopsis

Set in Israel during 1948, the film tells of a house by the sea in Tel Aviv-Yafo, from which Arabs have had to flee in haste, which becomes the home of Jewish survivors who managed to escape the inferno in Europe. It deals with the turmoil of their existence, under the shadow of the unresolved conflict between Jews and Arabs.

Reception
Journalist  opined that “the film is filled with a great many wonderful cinematic moments,” while fellow journalist  largely dismissed the “lack of proper cinematic tools,” and fellow journalist  awarded it three out of five stars. The film was released on DVD on 19 June 2018. The  has rated this film as being appropriate for all audiences.

References

External links

 (NMC Music's Globus United King Films Channel) 

2016 films
2010s historical drama films
2016 independent films
2010s Arabic-language films
Films directed by Michal Bat-Adam
Films set in Tel Aviv
Films shot in Israel
2010s Hebrew-language films
Israeli historical drama films
Israeli independent films
Films about the 1948 Palestinian exodus
2016 multilingual films
Israeli multilingual films